The men's 5,000 metres at the 2004 Summer Olympics as part of the athletics program were held at the Athens Olympic Stadium on August 25 and 28.

The final witnessed an epic clash between two track greats from different generations: in his final competitive international race, 1500m champion and track legend Hicham El Guerrouj of Morocco and 10,000 meter Olympic champion, world record holder at the distance and rising star 21-year-old Kenenisa Bekele of Ethiopia.  The race had a preview at the World Championships a year earlier.  There the medalists were barely separated, but the young World Junior record holder Eliud Kipchoge upset the stars by taking gold after El Guerrouj had tried to break away on the final lap.

Here Bekele took an early lead, but instead chose not to push the pace.  That duty fell onto Kipchoge, who had watched from behind the year before.  Here, El Guerrouj spent most of the race watching from several places behind the lead.  As the last lap began, El Guerrouj moved toward the front.  Bekele challenged Kipchoge with 200 metres to go.  It was a shoulder to shoulder all out sprint battle as Kipchoge refused to let Bekele by, but he couldn't hold him off.  Bekele broke out at a lead of several metres.   El Guerrouj first ran down Kipchoge, then overhauled the Ethiopian in the final strides to win by just two tenths of a second. With this, El Guerrouj set a historic milestone as the first ever athlete to strike a distance double (1500–5000) since Paavo Nurmi did so in 1924, denying Bekele a chance to do the Olympic 5000 and 10000 m double – which he would ultimately win four years later in Beijing.

Records
, the existing World and Olympic records were as follows.

No new records were set during the competition.

Qualification
The qualification period for athletics was 1 January 2003 to 9 August 2004. For the men's 5000 metres, each National Olympic Committee was permitted to enter up to three athletes that had run the race in 13:21.50 or faster during the qualification period. If an NOC had no athletes that qualified under that standard, one athlete that had run the race in 13:25.40 or faster could be entered.

Schedule
All times are Eastern European Summer Time (UTC+3)

Results

Round 1
Qualification rule: The first five finishers in each heat (Q) plus the next five fastest overall runners (q) advanced to the final.

Heat 1

Heat 2

Final

References

External links
 IAAF Athens 2004 Olympic Coverage

M
5000 metres at the Olympics
Men's events at the 2004 Summer Olympics